Ward Branch is a  long 1st order tributary to Browns Branch in Kent County, Delaware.

Course
Ward Branch rises on the Lednum Branch divide about 1 mile east-northeast of Marvels Crossroads, Delaware.  Ward Branch then flows north to meet Browns Branch about 1-mile northeast of Argos Choice, Delaware.

Watershed
Ward Branch drains  of area, receives about 45.6 in/year of precipitation, has a topographic wetness index of 616.68 and is about 6.7% forested.

See also
List of Delaware rivers

Maps

References

Rivers of Delaware
Rivers of Kent County, Delaware
Tributaries of the Murderkill River